A memorial wall is a wall typically engraved to commemorate a number of people with something in common (e.g., from one country or place) killed in a single conflict, violent event, or disaster, often with names.

Memorial Walls include:
Many memorial walls without specific names in places such as crematoriums and synagogues
Memorial Wall of Royal Australian Air Force Memorial
Memorial Stadium (Baltimore)#Memorial wall (US)
Budapest Ghetto#Memorial Wall
Canadian National Vimy Memorial (France)
CIA Memorial Wall (US)
Memorial Wall of Cenotaph War Memorial, Colombo (Sri Lanka)
DIA Memorial Wall (US)
FDNY memorial wall (New York City, US)
Korean War Memorial Wall (disambiguation)
Korean War Memorial Wall (Canada)
Walls of Kranji War Memorial (Singapore)
Memorial for the Disappeared (Chile)
Piccadilly, Warwickshire#Miners Memorial Wall (England)
Tangshan Earthquake Memorial Wall (China)
Veterans Memorial Wall (US)
Vietnam Veterans Memorial (US)
The Moving Wall, replica of Vietnam Veterans Memorial